Yarin Hassan (born March 22, 1994) is an Israeli footballer.

Club career
On 19 March 2021, he signed with Serie C club Bisceglie in Italy.

Personal life
He is of a Tunisian-Jewish descent.

Honours
 Liga Leumit winner: 2013–14
 Israel State Cup runner-up: 2014

References

1994 births
Living people
Israeli Jews
Israeli footballers
Maccabi Netanya F.C. players
Hapoel Petah Tikva F.C. players
Hapoel Hadera F.C. players
A.S. Bisceglie Calcio 1913 players
Hapoel Umm al-Fahm F.C. players
Hapoel Nir Ramat HaSharon F.C. players
Israeli Premier League players
Liga Leumit players
Serie C players
Footballers from Netanya
Israeli expatriate footballers
Expatriate footballers in Italy
Israeli expatriate sportspeople in Italy
Israel under-21 international footballers
Israeli people of Tunisian-Jewish descent
Association football defenders